Nygårdsfjellet Wind Farm is a windfarm located in Narvik, Norway. The wind turbines are located 400 m above sea level. The farm is owned by Nordkraft Vind, a joint venture between Narvik Energi and DONG Energy. It started production in 2006 with three 2.3 MW turbines, an annual production of 26 GWh and with plans to add more turbines.

In 2011 an additional 11 turbines of the same capacity were commissioned, bringing the total capacity to 32.2 MW and the annual production to 104.2 GWh corresponding to the average consumption of 5200 Norwegian households.

See also

 Nygårds Hydroelectric Power Station

References

Wind farms in Norway
Narvik
Ørsted (company) wind farms
2006 establishments in Norway